Prorophora albunculella is a species of snout moth. It is found in Turkey and Iraq.

References

Phycitinae
Moths described in 1879
Insects of Turkey